Chris Williams may refer to:

Sportspeople

American football
Chris Williams (defensive back) (born 1959), American football player
Chris Williams (born 1968), American football defensive tackle; see 1991 Phoenix Cardinals season
Chris Williams (offensive lineman) (born 1985), American football offensive tackle
Chris Williams (wide receiver) (born 1987), American Canadian Football League (CFL) wide receiver
Chris Williams (defensive tackle) (born 1998), American football defensive tackle

Association football (soccer)
Chris Williams (Canadian soccer) (born 1981), Canadian soccer player
Chris Williams (English footballer) (born 1985), English professional footballer
Chris Williams (football manager) (born 1986), Australian football manager

Other sports
Chris Williams (golfer) (born 1959), South African golfer
Chris Williams (basketball) (1980–2017), American basketball player
Chris Williams (cricketer, born 1983), English cricketer
Chris Williams (cyclist) (fl. 1998), Welsh cyclist
Chris Williams (rugby league), Australian rugby league player

Others
Chris Williams (bishop) (born 1936), Anglican bishop in Canada
Chris Williams (journalist) (born 1951/52), editor of the Scottish Daily Mail
Chris Williams (academic) (born 1963), Welsh professor and historian
Chris Williams (actor) (born 1967), American actor and comedian
Chris Williams (director) (born 1968), American film director
Chris J. K. Williams, British structural engineer

See also
Christopher Williams (disambiguation)
Kris Williams (disambiguation)
Christine Williams (disambiguation)